Hana Lani Hayes (born March 29, 1999) is an American actress. She is best known for providing the voice and motion capture of Sarah Miller in the action-adventure video game The Last of Us (2013) and portraying Lizzie Sanderson in the legal comedy series The Grinder (2015–2016).

Career
Hayes has played guest roles in series such as Law & Order: Special Victims Unit, Criminal Minds, and Grey's Anatomy. In 2013, she provided the voice and motion capture of Sarah in the critically acclaimed action-adventure video game The Last of Us. In 2015, she began playing Lizzie Sanderson in the legal comedy series The Grinder. In 2018, she played the younger Elise Rainer in the horror film Insidious: The Last Key.

Filmography

Film

Television

Video games

References

External links
 
 
 
 

1999 births
21st-century American actresses
Actresses from Tucson, Arizona
American child actresses
American film actresses
American television actresses
American video game actresses
Living people